Descemet membrane endothelial keratoplasty (DMEK) is a method of corneal transplantation. The DMEK technique involves the removal of a very thin sheet of tissue from the posterior side of a person's cornea, replacing it with the two innermost layers of corneal tissue from a donor's eyeball. The two corneal layers which are exchanged are the Descemet's membrane and the corneal endothelium. The person's corneal tissue is gently excised and replaced with the donor tissue via small 'clear corneal incisions' (small corneal incisions just anterior to the corneal limbus. The donor tissue is tamponaded against the person's exposed posterior corneal stroma by injecting a small air bubble into the anterior chamber. To ensure the air tamponade is effective, it is necessary for people to strictly posture so that they are looking up at the ceiling during the recovery period and until the air bubble has fully resorbed.

Medical uses 
Indications for DMEK include: 

 Corneal dystrophy involving the corneal endothelial layer, e.g.: 
 Fuchs' endothelial dystrophy
 Posterior polymorphous corneal dystrophy
Pseudophakic bullous keratopathy
Iridocorneal endothelial syndrome

Nomenclature 
A minor variation to DMEK is the Descemet Membrane Automated Endothelial Keratoplasty (DMAEK), which involves automated preparation of donor tissue, using a microkeratome or femtosecond laser.

See also 
 Corneal transplantation#Endothelial keratoplasty
 Corneal transplantation#DSEK/DSAEK/DMEK

References 

Eye procedures
Corneal transplantation
Medical procedures
Eye surgery
Ophthalmology